Wild: From Lost to Found on the Pacific Crest Trail is the 2012 memoir by the American writer, author, and podcaster Cheryl Strayed. The memoir describes Strayed's 1,100-mile hike on the Pacific Crest Trail in 1995 as a journey of self-discovery. The book reached No. 1 on the New York Times Best Seller list, and was the first selection for Oprah's Book Club 2.0.

The film adaptation was released in December 2014 and stars Reese Witherspoon as Cheryl Strayed.

Plot 
Wild is Cheryl Strayed's memoir of her 1,100-mile solo hike along the Pacific Crest Trail. Strayed's journey begins in the Mojave Desert and she hikes through California and Oregon to the Bridge of the Gods into Washington. The book also contains flashbacks to prior life occurrences that led Strayed to begin her journey.

At the age of 22, Strayed had been devastated by the lung cancer death of her mother, who was only 45. Her stepfather disengaged from Strayed's family, and her brother and sister remained distant. Strayed and her husband divorced, and eventually a lover convinced her to start using heroin.

Seeking self-discovery and resolution of her enduring grief and personal challenges, at the age of 26, Strayed set out on her journey, alone and with no prior hiking experience. Wild intertwines the stories of Strayed's life before and during the journey, describing her physical challenges, emotional, and spiritual realizations while on the trail.

Distinctions and recognition
 May 30, 2012: Oprah Winfrey announced the launch of Oprah's Book Club 2.0 with Wild as its first selection.
 July 15, 2012: Wild reached No. 1 on The New York Times Best Seller list.
 December 3, 2012: Wild was named No. 6 best non-fiction book of 2012 by The Christian Science Monitor.
 December 4, 2012: Wild was voted No. 1 book of 2012 in the "Memoir and Autobiography" category in the "Goodreads Choice Awards 2012."
 January 2013: Wild was selected as Book of the Week on BBC Radio 4, where a five-episode abridgement of the book was read.
 2013: Wild spent 52 weeks on the NPR Hardcover Nonfiction Bestseller List.
 April 2013: For Wild, Strayed received the Reader's Choice Award in the 2013 Oregon Book Awards.
 As of August 2015: Wild has been translated into 30 languages.

Film

By the time the book was published, actress Reese Witherspoon's film company Pacific Standard had optioned Wild for film rights. Witherspoon portrayed Strayed in the 2014 film Wild, which was written by the novelist Nick Hornby and directed by Jean-Marc Vallée.

Reception
In The New York Times, Dwight Garner wrote that "the lack of ease in (Strayed's) life made her fierce and funny; she hammers home her hard-won sentences like a box of nails," adding that the memoir reflected a "too infrequent sight: that of a writer finding her voice, and sustaining it, right in front of your eyes." 

In The New York Times, Dani Shapiro called the book "spectacular... at once a breathtaking adventure tale and a profound meditation on the nature of grief and survival, ... both a literary and human triumph." Shapiro wrote that unlike many parallel-arc stories, Strayed's two parallel narratives—the challenging hike itself and the difficult life events that preceded it—are delivered in perfect balance. According to Shapiro, the memoir did not overdramatize its events, but followed a "powerful, yet understated, imperative to understand (their) meaning," allowing readers "to feel how her actions and her internal struggles intertwine, and appreciate the lessons she finds embedded in the natural world."

In Slate, Melanie Rehak began by contrasting Wild with the 2006 memoir Eat, Pray, Love—whose story was "pleasant, mild, romantic, and completely lacking urgency" and in which everything would work out. In contrast, Wild was said to be "crammed with... passages of vicious discomfort" and was carried by a voice that was "fierce, billowing with energy, precise." Crediting the years that passed between Strayed's 1995 hike and her 2012 memoir, Rehak wrote that Strayed had "fine control" over "unfathomable, enormous experiences" and never wrote "from a place of desperation in the kind of semi-edited purge state that has marred so many true stories."

By the time of the film Wild's release, in December 2014 A.O. Scott wrote in The New York Times that Strayed's memoir was "already a classic of wilderness writing and modern feminism." In 2019, Anna Leahy wrote  in the Los Angeles Review of Books that Wild was likely the most popular memoir approaching the subject of cancer from the perspectives of loved ones and caregivers.

References

External links
 The Most Inspiring Quotes from Wild at Oprah.com
 Wild's page on the author's website (includes pictures) (archive)

2012 non-fiction books
Alfred A. Knopf books
American memoirs
American travel books
Memoirs adapted into films
Books about education
Hiking books